Goeldi's spiny-rat (Proechimys goeldii) is a spiny rat species found in Brazil.

Phylogeny
Morphological characters and mitochondrial cytochrome b DNA sequences showed that P. goeldii belongs to the so-called goeldii group of Proechimys species, and shares closer phylogenetic affinities with the other members of this clade: P. steerei and P. quadruplicatus.

References

Proechimys
Mammals described in 1905
Taxa named by Oldfield Thomas